Pharmacopeia was a public biotechnology company that pioneered the field of small molecule combinatorial chemistry.

Pharmacopeia was founded by Larry Bock and Drs. Michael Wigler, Clark Still and Jack Chabala.

Pharmacopeia went public in 1996 and was acquired by Ligand Pharmaceuticals on December 13, 2008.

References

External links

Biotechnology companies of the United States
1996 initial public offerings
2008 mergers and acquisitions